Khenchela ancient Mascula is the capital city of the administrative Khenchela Province (Wilaya), number 40, in the north east of Algeria. Situated in the Aures Mountains, 1200 m above sea level. The city is mainly populated by Berber Chaouis.

Geography

Climate 
Summers are warm and dry and winters are chilly and wetter, with the possibility of snowfall.

This is one of the coldest cities in Algeria.

History

Queen Kahina led a decades long war against the Islamic conquest in the 7th century, and she built a castle here.
During the Barbary period there were many inter town conflict over water resources.

The French army reached Khenchela in 1850 after heavy fighting and more strenuous resistance and set up a military administration. Organization of work of the city were undertaken. The first French settlers were allowed from 1878. Farms were built and they made plantations. In doing so, the farmers cleared a path for vegetation at the valley of Wadi Boughegal which in turn gave birth to natural grasslands, allowing cattle breeding and feeding the population with fresh dairy products (i.e. milk, butter, cheese).

In October 1905, the inauguration of the line of Railway Ain Beida in Khenchela meter gauge will provide a daily service with the North. Military administration lasted until 1912.

In 1982, a mass grave containing more than 1200 corpses from the war of Algeria is discovered. It would be the largest ever discovered in Algeria. The authorities and the Algerian press attribute it to the French army although this is disputed (these victims may have been French harkis).

Since then, the population has grown particularly fast: 12 000 inhabitants in 1954, 28,000 in 1962, 70,000 in 1987 and 87,196 in 2002. This increase is partly explained by population displacement during the war in Algeria, the area being a refuge for resistance fighters. This has posed and continues to pose planning problems (housing, water, sewer, electricity).

References

Chaoui people
Communes of Khenchela Province
Cities in Algeria
Province seats of Algeria
Khenchela Province